Alberto Castillo may refer to:

Alberto Castillo (performer) (1914–2002), Argentine singer and actor
Alberto Castillo (catcher) (born 1970 in Dominican Republic)
Alberto Castillo (pitcher) (born 1975 in Cuba)